Malashri (born Sridurga Pandey, 10 August 1973), is an Indian actress who works predominantly in Kannada cinema besides also having sporadically appeared in Telugu and Tamil language films. In a career spanning three decades she has appeared in more than 69 films. She began her career as a child artiste in the 1979 Tamil film Imayam. She made her debut as a adult in the 1989 Kannada-language film Nanjundi Kalyana. In the following years, she established herself as one of Kannada cinema's top heroines. She had been called, by the media and fans, "Kanasina Rani" She was popular for playing diverse roles in women-centric movies many of which were highly successful at the box-office.

Her debut film Nanjundi Kalyana was a major box office success, which was her breakthrough. Throughout the 90's she starred in several successful films like: Gajapathi Garvabhanga (1989), Policena Hendthi (1990), Kitturina Huli (1990), Rani Maharani (1990), Mruthyunjaya (1990), Hrudaya Haadithu (1991), Ramachaari (1991), Belli Kalungura (1992), Solillada Saradara (1993) and Gadibidi Aliya (1995) establishing herself as one of the top heroines of the Kannada film industry. In 1992, she starred in 19 films, breaking the 24-year-old record of highest releases in Kannada in a lead role in a single year, held by Dr. Rajkumar. She won the Filmfare Award for Best Actress in 1991 for her performance as a young woman inflicted with an incurable heart disease. In 2015 she won her first Karnataka State Film Award for Best Actress for her action-oriented role in Ganga.

Career

Child artiste
Malashri began her career as a child artiste and appeared in 35 films in Tamil and Telugu and she played the role of a boy in 26 of them. In a talk show, Majaa Talkies, she said that as a child, she was a fan of actor Amitabh Bachchan and would dress up like him, which prompted directors to cast her as a boy, in 1979 films like Imayam and Neela Malargal.

Lead roles
Writer and lyricist Chi. Udaya Shankar introduced Malashri to the Rajkumar family when they were on the look out for a fresh face opposite their son Raghavendra Rajkumar who was gearing to make his debut. Parvathamma Rajkumar decided to cast her in Nanjundi Kalyana (1989) and rechristened her from Durga to Malashri. Malashri went on to act in two other films with Vajreshwari Combines, Gajapathi Garvabhanga opposite Raghavendra again, and Mruthyunjaya with Shiva Rajkumar. Between the years 1989-1991 she starred in around 50 films, out of which 35 films were hits and 5 films were average grossers, making her the heroine with the highest hit percentage in the Kannada film industry.

In 1990 Malashri took on the famous double role in Rani Maharani (immortalized by Sridevi in Chaalbaaz) and won a huge fan following with her powerhouse performance. Her next film Hrudaya Haadithu where she played a young woman inflicted with a heart problem won her acclaim from the masses and critics alike as well as the Filmfare Best actress award for 1991. As she churned out hit after hit even the stalwart V. Ravichandran, who till then believed only in importing heroines from other states, cashed in on her popularity by casting her in Ramachaari (a remake of Tamil Hit Chinna Thambi). The move paid off, enabling him to come out of the financial crisis he faced due to the debacle of Shanti Kranti.

In later part of the 90s, Malashri had a string of less successful films like Prema Khaidi, Snehada Kadalalli, Megha Mandara, Arishina Kumkuma, and Solillada Saradara. She took brief hiatus after marriage and made comeback in the new millennium with "angry woman" roles in Chamundi (2000), Kannadada Kiran Bedi (2009), Shakti (2012), Veera (2013) and Ganga (2015).

Personal life
Malashri was born and brought up in Chennai (Chennai) to Telugu speaking mother Chandralekha, and Punjabi speaking father Pandey. Her mother tongue is Telugu. She shot to fame with Nanjundi Kalyana in 1989 but her personal life hit an all-time low the same year when her step mother, and grand mother died in a road accident. She was in a relationship with actor Sunil, her co-star of many films. But in 1994 they met with a car accident and while Malashree suffered multiple injuries, Sunil died on the spot. It was rumoured that they had been planning to get married. She was married to film producer Ramu in 1997 and they had a daughter and son together, Ananya (b. 2001) and Arjun. Her sister Subhashri was also an actress, who appeared in South Indian films.  Her husband Ramu died on 26 April 2021 due to Covid.

Filmography

Awards
Karnataka State Film Awards
 2015 : Karnataka State Film Award for Best Actress : Ganga

Filmfare Awards South
 1991: Filmfare Award for Best Actress: Hrudaya Haadithu
1993 : Cinema Express Award for Best Actress : Mangalya Bandhana

Other awards
1990 - Nandi Award for best Supporting Actress - Prema Khaidi 
 2011: NTR Award
2016: Santosham Award for Completing 25 Years in Cinema at 14th Santosham Film Awards

References

External links
 
 Malashri Filmography

Actresses in Kannada cinema
Actresses in Telugu cinema
Indian film actresses
Filmfare Awards South winners
1973 births
Living people
Telugu people
Telugu actresses
Actresses from Chennai
21st-century Indian actresses
20th-century Indian actresses
Indian child actresses
Child actresses in Tamil cinema
Child actresses in Telugu cinema
Santosham Film Awards winners
Actresses from Andhra Pradesh
Indian actresses